The  is a title awarded annually by the Japan Racing Association (JRA).
Since 1987 the honor has been part of the JRA Awards.

Records
Most successful horse (2 wins):
 Orfevre – 2012, 2013
 Kitasan Black – 2016, 2017

Winners

References

Horse racing in Japan: JRA Awards

Horse racing awards
Horse racing in Japan